Daudkandi is an upazila of Comilla District in the Division of Chittagong, Bangladesh.

Geography
It has 77,102 households and a total area of 376.23 km2.
which is located at the extreme near of the upazila by the Dhaka Chittagong Highway. Daudkandi village area is within the municipality and value of property here, like the rest of the municipality, have increased significantly.

Demographics

According to the 2011 Census of Bangladesh, Daudkandi upazila has a population of 349,910 living in 69,014 households. Daudkandi has a sex ratio of 1069 females per 1000 males and a literacy rate of 50.69%. 46,256 (13.22%) live in urban areas.

Administration
Daudkandi Upazila is divided into Daudkandi Municipality and 16 union parishads: Baropara, Betessor, Dakshin Eliotgonj, Doulotpur, Goalmari, Gouripur, Maruka, Mohammadpur Paschim, Maligaon, Mohammadpur Purbo, Passgacia Pachim, Podua, Sundolpur, Uttar Daudkandi, Uttar Eliotgonj, and Zinglatoli. The union parishads are subdivided into 186 mauzas and 267 villages.

Daudkandi Municipality is subdivided into 9 wards and 26 mahallas.

Notable residents
 Khondaker Mostaq Ahmad, 5th President of Bangladesh (15 August 1975 to 3 November 1975), was born at Dashpara village in 1919.
 Major General (Retd.) Mohammad Shubid Ali Bhuiyan has been the Member Parliament for constituency Comilla-1 since 2009.
 Dr.  Khandaker Mosharraf Hossain, Minister of Health and Family Welfare (2001-2006) and the Member of Parliament for constituency Comilla-2 from 1991 until 2006, was born at Gayaspur village in 1946.

See also
Upazilas of Bangladesh
Districts of Bangladesh
Divisions of Bangladesh

References

 
Upazilas of Comilla District